Namibia cinerea is a species of plant in the family Aizoaceae.

It is endemic to Namibia.  Its natural habitat is rocky areas.

It is threatened by habitat loss.

References

Aizoaceae
Endemic flora of Namibia
Near threatened plants
Near threatened biota of Africa
Taxonomy articles created by Polbot